Aunt Clara is a 1952 comedy novel by the British writer Noel Streatfeild. It concerns a respectable elderly woman who inherits her relative's estate which proves to include a greyhound and a brothel. Although her more worldly relatives expect her to struggle, she proves equal to the task.

Film adaptation
In 1954 it was adapted into a British film of the same title directed by Anthony Kimmins and starring Ronald Shiner, Margaret Rutherford and A. E. Matthews.

References

Bibliography
 Goble, Alan. The Complete Index to Literary Sources in Film. Walter de Gruyter, 1999.
 Hettinga, Donald R. & Schmidt, Gary D. British Children's Writers, 1914-1960. Gale Research, 1996.

1952 British novels
Novels by Noel Streatfeild
British comedy novels
Novels set in London
British novels adapted into films
William Collins, Sons books